Blade Runner 4: Eye and Talon is a science fiction novel by American writer K. W. Jeter, published in 2000 by Gollancz. It is the third book to continue the storyline of the film Blade Runner.

Plot

The book begins with an "out-take" section, written as a movie script, which describes the scene from the original movie in which Leon is subjected to the Voight-Kampff test.  However, in this version, the blade runner performing the test is a woman, and Leon kills her at the end of the test.  The section ends with an unknown person commenting "This one didn't work, either; we'll have to try another one.."

The story begins with the introduction of Iris, a female Blade Runner, and the best in her unit.  Meyer - her boss - tells her that the blade runner division is in danger; far fewer replicants are coming to Earth, and thus the economic value of the blade runners is dropping, giving the risk of a "reorganisation".  Meyer gives Iris the assignment to track down an owl - an extremely rare, real owl, named Scrappy.  Iris is skeptical, since if the owl is real (and thus not a replicant) the case seems to be nothing to do with the blade runners, but she accepts the job anyway.

Returning to her apartment, Iris uses a surresper - a version of the esper machine from the original Blade Runner which behaves as a virtual reality machine rather than a simple viewer - to analyse the data Meyer gave her about the owl.  The data record contains two recorded scenes.  The first shows Eldon Tyrell, feeding the owl.  The second shows Deckard's and Rachael's first meeting, in sight of the owl.  Iris does not recognise Deckard, and reacts with surprise when the surresper tells her that he was a blade runner; she's never heard of him, and his data have disappeared from many of the blade runner department's files.  Iris talks the events through with her pet "chat" - an artificial cat whose fur is designed to release relaxing drugs into the owner when it is stroked.

With no good leads, Iris steps out into the shopping districts of Los Angeles and starts asking around after the owl.  She does not make any progress, until a mysterious man approaches, knowing both her name and what she is doing.  At first, Iris attacks him, but he persuades her to trust him and takes her to his "home" within the wreckage of a downed advertising blimp.  The man, Vogel, tells Iris the owl's current location: hidden in a disused movie theatre nearby, guarded by men with illegal modified automatic weapons.  Iris is immediately shocked: she was never given any warning that the owl could be so heavily guarded, and her casual investigation could have gotten her shot.  Iris begins to distrust Meyer, for giving her the job; and she also does not trust Vogel, because she has no idea why he would give her this information.

Iris calls Meyer to ask for access to the police armory, and Meyer grudgingly agrees.  As Iris collects the weapons, the novel describes a scene in which a director and camera operator are monitoring both Iris and Vogel as they collect and prepare the weapons, and already have a monitoring camera prepared for the disused theatre in which they will be used.

Using the weapons, plus a drug supplied by Vogel to fool the temperature sensitive alarms, Vogel and Iris together enter the building and recapture the owl.  Iris then betrays Vogel, leaving him in the building while she escapes with the owl via an elevator.  Still not trusting Meyer, Iris takes the owl back to her apartment, where she confirms that it is the correct owl, and then quickly becomes afraid that she could be in danger if she is caught with the owl before she finds out what is so important about it.  Her cat offers her a mild 'hit' to relax her, but the moment she touches the cat's head, she is slammed with a massive overdose that leaves her sprawled on the floor.  An unknown man walks into the room and takes away the owl, explaining that he booby-trapped the cat, and remarking that he is doing Iris a favor by buying her more time.

Iris is taken to hospital to recover from the overdose, and while there she is met by Meyer, who is extremely angry that Iris did not bring the owl straight back to him and - as a result - lost it.  He tells her that she is being sacked from the Blade Runner division.  Meyer hands Iris the one remaining item that was found with the owl - a chain which had been used to fasten it to its perch.  Once Meyer is gone, Iris realises that the scratch marks on the inside of the ring are actually encoded data giving a GPS location.  She rushes out of the hospital to investigate.

The coordinate turns out to be the location of the ruined Tyrell building (destroyed in The Edge of Human).  Iris is surprised to meet Vogel there.  Vogel takes Iris into the ruins of the Tyrell building to show her where the owl came from, and talks about Tyrell's history, including the death of Tyrell at the hands of Roy Batty.  Iris has not heard of this murder, and Vogel is surprised, and uses a video projector in the quarters to show her the movie Blade Runner (which, within the book's setting, is a documentary).  Vogel then points out something that Iris herself had not noticed: that the Rachael replicant looks identical to Iris.  In the monitoring suite, the director comments that Vogel was not supposed to say that, and the camera operator asks why Iris would not have spotted it for herself.

As Iris and Vogel are in Tyrell's quarters, they hear someone else trying to break in. Vogel says that he has "gone off-script", and that the people coming are probably the film crew.  Iris and Vogel escape through a tunnel in the ruins, but Iris is quickly captured by a fleet of spinners and taken to a distant location in the desert.

In the desert base, Iris asks if she will be allowed to meet the director, but the guard claims never to have heard of him, and then leads Iris to meet an elderly man called Carsten.  He explains that their group is an alliance of former technical staff from other replicant companies.  Tyrell did not invent the replicant process; the UN destroyed the other replicant manufacturers in order to artificially create Tyrell's monopoly, using Tyrell just as a pawn.

Carsten takes Iris into a frozen duplicate of one of the Tyrell labs - Chew's eye lab.  He explains that Voight-Kampff machines did not really scan people's eyes and breathing to determine if they were replicants or not; the machines were searching for something else, and even contained lethal booby-traps to catch those who attempted to dismantle them to find out what it was.  Carsten then shows her that the lab also contains a number of replicant duplicates of Eldon Tyrell.

Iris is unimpressed.  Carsten explains that this was the original purpose of replicants - not to create multiple Tyrells at once, but for the replicants to be activated in sequence, each one extending Tyrell's own life by four years.  Although the ability to transfer the gestalt of a living person into a replicant body had been developed, it had not been perfected, and error inevitably crept into the process, meaning that after only a few iterations the generated replicants were insane, or vegetables.  What Eldon Tyrell discovered was a way to prevent that from happening.

Carsten asks her to think back to the moment when Tyrell was murdered by Batty, highlighting several unexplained discrepancies in the movie.  His claim is that Batty did not ever plan to have his lifespan extended.  That was only an excuse, to allow him to get close to Tyrell.  Batty came back to Earth to kill Eldon Tyrell, and for no other reason.  And not just to kill Tyrell, but to kill him in a very specific way - by crushing his eyes.  Carsten opens the eyelids of each of the duplicates, revealing that there are no eyes in any of them.  The eyes, the windows of the soul, were also the key to transferring a gestalt between multiple replicants without error; and Batty destroyed Tyrell's.  Batty's goal was to get revenge on Tyrell for consigning him to a life of slavery in the colonies, but he was aided by the UN, who had realised that Tyrell had discovered the key to eternal life.

Scrappy, the owl, contains a backup of Tyrell's personality.  With the owl, plus a suitable replicant, Tyrell could be brought to life once more.  Finally, Carsten opens the last transport container in the line, revealing an eyeless replicant of Iris, aka Rachael, aka Sarah.  Iris instantly shoots the suspended replicant.  The director, and the camera operator, are still monitoring the scene, observing all of Iris's reactions.  The camera operator begins to have doubts about what he is doing, wanting to warn Iris, to tell her that something about Carsten's story is not straight.

Two intruders burst into the base, shooting Carsten dead.  Iris quickly hides as Meyer walks into the room, but he mistakes the dead female replicant duplicate for her and leaves.  Outside, she hears him talking to someone else, then shooting him dead.  Leaving the compound, she finds that the other man was Vogel, and that the two of them together have murdered almost every living thing in the base.

A moment later, she sees Scrappy, the lost owl, flying over to perch on another man's elbow.  Approaching him, she recognises him as the blade runner Rick Deckard, accompanied by the child Rachael.  He admits that it was he who took the owl from her apartment, and that if he had not done so, she would now be dead.  Iris asks if he will take her back to LA, and the child Rachael interrupts, saying that she cannot go back to LA, because she has never been there in the first place.  Iris is confused, and Deckard points upwards, remarking that "Those aren't the stars you see from Earth."  Iris, Deckard, and Rachael depart in Deckard's spinner.

See also 
Blade Runner: Do Androids Dream of Electric Sheep? - original story by P K Dick
Blade Runner 1: A Story of the Future - film novelization by Les Martin
Blade Runner 2: The Edge of Human - K. W. Jeter
Blade Runner 3: Replicant Night - K. W. Jeter

2000 American novels
Blade Runner (franchise)
Novels by K. W. Jeter
2000 science fiction novels
American science fiction novels
Novels about virtual reality
Novels about drugs
Novels based on films